Skydance Animation Madrid (formerly known as Ilion Animation Studios) is a Spanish animation studio based in Madrid, Spain. It is a subsidiary of Skydance Media via Skydance Animation to create computer-animated films for theatrical release. After working with Skydance since 2017, they were acquired by the company in 2020, and rebranded as Skydance Animation Madrid.

History
Ilion Animation Studios was originally based in Madrid, Spain. The Perez Dolset brothers, Javier and Ignacio Perez Dolset, founded the company in the year of 2002 to make animated films. Ilion Animation Studios was a partner with U-Tad, which is a European University that is specialized in digital arts and technology. Ilion came up with all of its own content. On occasion, Ilion worked with some of its third parties. Ilion Animation Studios was independently and privately owned.

In March 2017, Ilion announced that they would partner with Skydance Animation to produce two animated feature films: Luck and Spellbound. Skydance Animation formally acquired the studio in April 2020, renaming it as Skydance Animation Madrid.

Productions

Feature films

Released films

Upcoming films

Short films

References

External links
 

Mass media companies established in 2002
2020 mergers and acquisitions
Spanish companies established in 2002
Spanish animation studios
Companies based in the Community of Madrid